Hard Steel is a 1942 British drama film directed by Norman Walker and starring Wilfrid Lawson, Betty Stockfeld and John Stuart. It was based on the novel Steel Saraband by Roger Dataller. The film was one of four made by G.H.W. Productions backed by the Rank Organisation. The film follows the rise of an ambitious steel worker as he is appointed to run his local steel mill. He soon outrages the employees with his ruthless behaviour - and his negligence leads to the accidental death of one of the workers. As the Second World War breaks out he realises what he has become, and seeks a chance of redemption.

Cast

References

Bibliography
 Murphy, Robert. Realism and Tinsel: Cinema and Society in Britain 1939-48. Routledge, 1992.

External links

1942 films
1942 drama films
British drama films
1940s English-language films
Films directed by Norman Walker
Films set in England
Films based on British novels
Films set in the 1930s
Films set in Sheffield
British black-and-white films
Films scored by Percival Mackey
1940s British films